Fernando Marcelino Lapuente (31 January 1928 – 2 September 1993) represented Argentina at the 1948 Summer Olympics in London, he was entered in the 100 m and the 4x100 m relay, but did not get past the heats in either event. His personal best for 100m was 10.6 seconds in 1949.

References

 Fernando Lapuente's profile at Sports Reference.com

1928 births
1993 deaths
Place of birth missing
Argentine male sprinters
Olympic athletes of Argentina
Athletes (track and field) at the 1948 Summer Olympics
Pan American Games bronze medalists for Argentina
Pan American Games medalists in athletics (track and field)
Athletes (track and field) at the 1951 Pan American Games
Medalists at the 1951 Pan American Games
20th-century Argentine people